Colliguaja is a plant genus of the family Euphorbiaceae first described as a genus in 1782. It is native to South America.

Species
 Colliguaja brasillensis Klotzsch ex Baill. - Paraguay, S Brazil, Uruguay
 Colliguaja dombeyana A.Juss. - S Chile
 Colliguaja integerrima Gillies & Hook. - S Chile, W Argentina
 Colliguaja odorifera Molina - N & C Chile
 Colliguaja salicifolia Gillies & Hook. - C Chile

Formerly included
moved to Spegazziniophytum 
Colliguaja patagonica Speg. - Spegazziniophytum patagonicum (Speg.) Esser in A.Radcliffe-Smith

References

Euphorbiaceae genera
Hippomaneae
Flora of South America